Yashpal Sharma is an Indian Hindi and Punjabi film actor and theatre artist.

He also played the role as Don Rana in a sequence of popular TV sitcom Taarak Mehta Ka Ooltah Chashmah (2008-present) on SAB TV. He played Kuwar Singh in Zee's Mera Naam Karegi Roshan. Yashpal is also a stage actor and appears in live plays. He formerly starred in Zee's Neeli Chhatri Waale. The Haryanvi film Pagdi: The Honour was awarded at the 62nd National Film Awards.

Early life and education
Sharma was born and brought up in a lower-middle-class Brahmin family in Hisar in the state of Haryana. Since childhood, he was interested in acting and used to actively organise and participate in Ramlila during Dasara (also called Navaratri) festivals.

He graduated from the National School of Drama, Mandi House, New Delhi in 1994, the lead role of his theatre play franchise (Koi Baat Chale) with writer and director Ramji Bali.

Career
After his graduation he joined the National School of Drama Repertory Company in Delhi, where he worked for about two years before moving to Mumbai in 1997.

His first big break was Govind Nihlani's film, Hazaar Chaurasi Ki Maa (1998), which gave him a chance to act alongside Jaya Bachchan and Nandita Das. He also started appearing in commercial films, like Shool and Arjun Pandit. However, it was the Academy Award-nominated Lagaan (2001) which brought him to the limelight, and thereafter he appeared in Gangajal (2003) and Ab Tak Chhappan. He has been a regular in films of Shyam Benegal and Prakash Jha and continues to work as a stage actor in Mumbai.

In 2010, he acted in Rage productions' bilingual play, One on One and the play Lakeerein, written by Gulzar and directed by Salim Arif, opposite actor, Lubna Salim.

He made his television debut with Mera Naam Karegi Roshan on Zee TV in 2010. Then he played a cameo role in Taarak Mehta Ka Ooltah Chashmah on SAB TV in 2011. The same year, he appeared in a significant role in Dev Anand's Chargesheet, which turned out to be the veteran actor's last film before his death.

Sharma returned on television in a lead role as Bhagwandas with Neeli Chhatri Waale on Zee TV in 2014. His upcoming film as lead is Das Capital, directed by Rajen Kothari.

He briefly appeared in a short documentary The Facebook Generation, produced by Blue Strike Productions and Dev Samaj Modern School and directed by Sahil Bhardwaj. The film competed in the Reel to Real film making competition at Harmony 2012 organised by The Global Education and Leadership Foundation and was among the top 10 finalists.

He turned to film direction with a biopic on Haryanvi poet Pandit Lakhmi Chand, which he wrote as well.

Filmography

Television

Short films

Web series

Awards and nominations

 2004: Nominated: Filmfare Best Villain Award for Gangaajal
 2004: Nominated: IIFA Best Performance in a Negative Role for Gangaajal
 2004: Nominated: Screen Weekly Awards for Gangaajal
 2004: Nominated: Zee Cine Awards for Gangaajal
 2022: Won: 68th National Film Awards for Dada Lakhmi in Best Feature Film in Haryanvi

References

External links 

 
 

Indian male film actors
Male actors in Hindi cinema
Indian male stage actors
Living people
People from Hisar (city)
National School of Drama alumni
Male actors from Haryana
20th-century Indian male actors
21st-century Indian male actors
Male actors in Punjabi cinema
Male actors in Gujarati-language films
Year of birth missing (living people)